Cristi Lea Conaway (born August 14, 1964) is an American actress and fashion designer.

Early life and education
Conaway was raised in Lubbock, Texas. Her father was a car dealer and her mother is a real estate agent. She attended Southern Methodist University, where she studied acting.

Career

Conaway moved from Dallas to Los Angeles, California to start acting where she began as a catalog model. She made her television debut on the 1990 made-for-TV movie, Children of the Bride, and her movie debut in 1991's Doc Hollywood in a minor role. In 1992, Conaway appeared in the movie Batman Returns, as the Ice Princess. After Batman Returns, she worked in various roles in TV shows and movies, including Tales from the Crypt. She also played the "other woman" Honey Parker in the 1993 remake of Attack of the 50 Ft. Woman. In 1997, she co-starred in the short-lived TV series Timecop (based on the 1994 movie) as Claire Hemmings.

In 2002, Conaway left her acting career to become a fashion designer. She started with scarves, but later on, she expanded her line to include sweaters and silk dresses, and in 2004, she added a men's collection.

Filmography

Film
Doc Hollywood (1991) - Receptionist at Halberstrom Clinic
Batman Returns (1992) - Ice Princess
Husbands and Wives (1992) - Shawn Grainger
Nina Takes a Lover (1994) - Friend
Underworld (1996) - Julianne
My Brother's War (1997) - Kelly Hall
Joe Somebody (2001) - Abby Manheim

Television
Children of the Bride (1990) - Lydia
Attack of the 50 Ft. Woman (1993) - Louise "Honey" Parker
Tales from the Crypt (1995) - Willa Sandelton ("99 & 44/100% Pure Horror")
Timecop (1997) - Claire Hemmings

Video Games
 Loadstar: The Legend of Tully Bodine (1994) - News Anchor (voice)

Personal life

Conaway is married to Mark Murphy. The couple have two children together and live in Santa Monica, California. She was previously married to actor Salvator Xuereb in 1991.

References

External links
Cristi Conaway Los Angeles (archived)
Cristi Conaway Design (archived)
Suede Box (archived)

1964 births
Actresses from Texas
American fashion designers
American women fashion designers
American film actresses
American television actresses
Living people
People from Lubbock, Texas
Southern Methodist University alumni
21st-century American women